Ossora (Koryak: Асоран, Asoran) is a selo and the administrative center of Karaginsky District of Koryak Okrug of Kamchatka Krai, Russia. Population: 

Until 2012, Ossora was an urban locality (an urban-type settlement).

Climate
While there is a substantial maritime influence vis-à-vis inland areas of the Russian Far East and even vis-à-vis the Sea of Okhotsk coast, the climate is much colder than the western coasts of Europe and North America on similar latitudes, for instance being  colder than Juneau and  colder than Oslo.

References

Rural localities in Kamchatka Krai
Road-inaccessible communities of Russia